Astellia (sometimes known as Astellia Online) is a massively multiplayer online role-playing game developed by Korean Studio 8.

Game was originally released in Korean in late 2018 and launched in summer 2019 in North America. Publisher Barunson released the game free-to-play in Korea and buy-to-play in the West. The game is a high fantasy MMORPG that uses a system of summonable companions called Astels. The player can summon an Astel to complement their weaknesses or strengthen their own power. The Astels are collectable in-game.

Barunson abandoned the game in April 2020 and gave it back to developer studio to found a new publisher.
New version of the game called Astellia Royal was released as free-to-play in Steam March 2021.
Game service (both western versions) was terminated in October 2021.

The game was rerereleased in west as a NFT game called Astel of Atra in December 2022. In this version of the game the Astels are tradeable NFTs stored in Polygon blockchain. Players can earn cryptocurrency in game, but they need to own an Astel NFT to obtain it. It's one of the first play-to-earn blockchain/cryptocurrency titles released (along with other Korean MMORPG title MIR4 of The Legend of Mir series).

References

External links
 (in Korean)

2018 video games
Active massively multiplayer online games
Massively multiplayer online role-playing games
Fantasy massively multiplayer online role-playing games
Unreal Engine games
Video games developed in South Korea
Windows games